Aubrey is a given name and surname of French origin.

Aubrey may also refer to:

Places
United States
Aubrey, Alaska
Aubrey, Arkansas
Aubrey, Texas
Aubrey, Wisconsin
Aubrey Cliffs, at Aubrey and Prospect Valleys, south of west Grand Canyon, Arizona
Aubrey Peak (Hualapai Mountains), Hualapai Mountains, Arizona
Aubrey Peak (Rawhide Mountains), Aubrey Peak Wilderness, Arizona
Aubrey Valley, Mohave County, Arizona
Fort Aubrey, Hamilton County, Kansas
Canada
Aubrey Island, Nunavut

Popular culture
"Aubrey" (The X-Files), a second-season episode of The X-Files
Aubrey (song), a song by Bread from the album Guitar Man
Aubrey (TV series), a 1980 British cartoon series

Entertainers

 Aubrey Ayala, a vocal artist from Philadelphia
 Aubrey Plaza, American actress, comedian, and producer

See also
 Aubry (disambiguation)